The 2018 Bommarito Automotive Group 500 Presented by Valvoline was the 15th round of the 2018 IndyCar Series season. The race was held on August 26 at Gateway Motorsports Park in Madison, Illinois, just east of St. Louis, Missouri. 2017 Indy 500 pole winner Scott Dixon qualified on pole position after qualifying was canceled due to rain, while 2018 Indy 500 champion Will Power took victory in the 248-lap race.

Results

Qualifying 
Qualifying was canceled due to rain, so the race grid is based on entrant point standings.

Race 

 Notes

 Points include 1 point for leading at least 1 lap during a race, an additional 2 points for leading the most race laps, and 1 point for Pole Position.

Championship standings after the race 

Drivers' Championship standings

Manufacturer standings

 Note: Only the top five positions are included.

References 

Bommarito Automotive Group 500
Bommarito Automotive Group 500
Bommarito Automotive Group 500